The Treaty of London was signed on 8 February 1956 to set up the independent Federation of Malaya, which achieved its independence on 31 August 1957.

See also

Reid Commission
Merdeka Day

References

External links 
British Pathe video of the conference

Federation of Malaya
1956 in Malaya
Treaties concluded in 1956
Treaties entered into force in 1957
London 1956
Treaties of the Federation of Malaya
1956 in London